The 2013 Ukrainian Cup Final is a football match that was played at the Metalist Stadium, Kharkiv, on 22 May 2013. The match was the 22nd Ukrainian Cup Final and was contested by the champions of Ukraine Shakhtar Donetsk and Chornomorets Odesa. This was the third time that the final match had returned to Kharkiv.

Since Shakhtar had qualified for the 2013–14 UEFA Champions League, Chornomorets would then qualify for the 2013–14 UEFA Europa League. During the draw for the semi-finals, the matchup Shakhtar Donetsk–Sevastopol was identified as the home team for the final.

Road to Kharkiv 

As Ukrainian Premier League members Shakhtar Donetsk and Chornomorets Odesa did not have to go through the qualification phase of the competition.

Previous encounters 
This was the first Ukrainian Cup final between the two teams. The two teams also met in the semi-finals in 2007–08, 2003–04 and 1994–95. On all three occasions, Shakhtar was victorious.

Chornomorets had appeared only twice in a Cup final winning on both occasions and their opponents Shakhtar had appeared in 12 Cup finals, winning eight of them.

Television 
As last year, the match was broadcast on ICTV in Ukraine.

Match

Details

Match statistics

See also
 2012–13 Ukrainian Premier League

References

External links 
 Krikunov, A. Shakhtar wins the Ukrainian Cup! cup.sport.ua. May 22, 2013.

Cup Final
Ukrainian Cup finals
Ukrainian Cup Final 2013
Ukrainian Cup Final 2013
Ukrainian Cup Final 2013
May 2013 sports events in Ukraine